Salvadori may refer to:

Surname
Salvadori (surname), Italian surname

Birds
Salvadori's antwren, a bird species
Salvadori's fig parrot, a species of parrot 
Salvadori's nightjar, a bird species
Salvadori's pheasant, a bird species
Salvadori's serin, a bird species
Salvadori's teal, a bird species
Salvadori's weaver, a bird species

Buildings
Palazzo Salvadori, a historic building in Trento, Italy